Annona macroprophyllata is a species of plant in the family Annonaceae. It is native to El Salvador, Guatemala, Honduras and Mexico.

Description
A bush reaching 3-4 meters in height.  Its membranous, elliptical leaves are 4-6 by 2–3.5 centimeters and have rounded or slightly indented tips.  The leaves are hairless on both surfaces.  Its petioles are 2-3 millimeters long.  Its solitary flowers are on 1–2.7 centimeter long pedicels.  Its oval sepals are 3-4 millimeters long and covered in rust-colored shaggy hairs. Its outer petals are 20 by 5-7 millimeters and covered in fine hairs.  The mature, thick, fleshy, outer petals have an outer surface that is green at the base and yellow at the tip, while its inner surface has pink and red highlights. Its inner petals are rudimentary.  Its ovaries are hairless.

Reproductive biology
The pollen of A. macroprophyllata is shed as permanent tetrads.

Distribution and habitat
It has been observed growing at an elevation of 1,110 meters.

Uses
Bioactive molecules extracted from the leaves have been reported to have alpha-glucosidase inhibitor activity.

References

External links
 

macroprophyllata
Flora of El Salvador
Flora of Guatemala
Flora of Honduras
Flora of Mexico
Plants described in 1910
Taxa named by John Donnell Smith